is a public university in San'yō-Onoda, Yamaguchi, Japan. The school was first established as a junior college in 1987. It became a four-year college in 1995.

Faculty & Graduate Schools 

 Faculty of Engineering
 Department of Mechanical Engineering
 Department of Electrical Engineering
 Department of Applied Chemistry
 Faculty of Pharmaceutical Sciences
 Department of Pharmaceutical Sciences 
 Graduate School of Engineering
 Department of Engineering

External links
 Official website 

Educational institutions established in 1987
Public universities in Japan
Universities and colleges in Yamaguchi Prefecture
1987 establishments in Japan